The Hiro H1H (or Navy Type 15) was a 1920s Japanese bomber or reconnaissance biplane flying boat developed from the Felixstowe F.5 by the Hiro Naval Arsenal for the Imperial Japanese Navy. The aircraft were built by Hiro, the Yokosuka Naval Arsenal and Aichi.

Design and development
Following licensed production of the Felixstowe F.5 for the Imperial Japanese Navy the company developed an improved version known as the H1H or Navy Type 15. The aircraft was built with three different engine types fitted, the Navy Type 15-I with a wooden hull had longer span upper wings and the Navy Type 15-II had four-bladed propellers. The H1H remained in front line naval service through the 1930s.

Variants
H1H1
Variant powered by two 450hp (336kW) Lorraine W-12 engines.
H1H2
Variant powered by either two 450hp (336kW) Lorraine W-12 or two 500hp (373kW) BMW VII engines.
H1H3
Variant powered by two 450hp (336kW) Lorraine W-12 engines.

Operators

Imperial Japanese Navy Air Service

Specifications (H1H1)

See also

References

Notes

Bibliography

1920s Japanese patrol aircraft
H1H
Flying boats
Biplanes
Twin piston-engined tractor aircraft
Aircraft first flown in 1925